Ironbank is a semi-rural suburb of Adelaide, South Australia. It is in the City of Onkaparinga and Adelaide Hills Council local government areas, approximately 21.9 km from the Adelaide city centre.

Services
In Ironbank, there is the Faith Community Meeting Hall, the local Ironbank Country Fire Service, a campsite and was well known for the used caryard on the outskirts, which was closed in 2020. Ironbank also has an Australian rules football club (the Ironbank Cherry Gardens Thunderers), a tennis club and netball club. The El-Carim Campsite is home to the Adelaide (Latvian) 14th Scout Group.

References

External links
 Adelaide Hills Council
 City of Onkaparinga
 Ironbank Faith Community
 Ironbank Football Club

Suburbs of Adelaide